Maxwell Cornelius Manning (November 18, 1918 – June 23, 2003) was a pitcher in Negro league baseball. He played for the Newark Eagles between 1938 and 1949.

A native of Rome, Georgia, Manning served in the United States Army Air Forces during World War II. In the 1946 Negro World Series, he started two games and went 1-1 to help the Eagles win the championship.

Manning appeared in a 2003 episode of the PBS series History Detectives, which featured an investigation into how a baseball field dedicated to fellow Negro league player John Henry Lloyd (better known as "Pop" Lloyd) came to be in Atlantic City, New Jersey during a period where racial discrimination was in force. Manning died in Pleasantville, New Jersey in 2003 at age 84.

References

External links

 and Seamheads

1918 births
2003 deaths
Newark Eagles players
Baseball pitchers
Baseball players from Georgia (U.S. state)
People from Pleasantville, New Jersey
Sportspeople from Rome, Georgia
United States Army Air Forces personnel of World War II
20th-century African-American sportspeople
21st-century African-American people